Dwight Scales (born May 30, 1953) is a former American football wide receiver who  played eight seasons in the National Football League (NFL). After playing college football at Grambling State University, he spent 8 years in the NFL, from 1976 to 1984, playing on a variety of different teams. After his playing career ended, he worked as the offensive coordinator at St. Michael's Catholic Academy, a private Catholic high school in Austin, Texas from 1997 to 1999.

References

External links
 

1953 births
Living people
American football wide receivers
Grambling State Tigers football players
Los Angeles Rams players
Morehouse Maroon Tigers football coaches
New York Giants players
San Diego Chargers players
Seattle Seahawks players
High school football coaches in Texas
Sportspeople from Little Rock, Arkansas
African-American coaches of American football
African-American players of American football
21st-century African-American people
20th-century African-American sportspeople